Kevin Carter (1960–1994) was a South African photojournalist.

Kevin Carter may also refer to:

Kevin Carter (American football) (born 1973), American National Football League player
"Kevin Carter" (song), a 1996 song by the British band Manic Street Preachers about the photojournalist

Carter, Kevin